"You're the Reason" is a 1961 song by Bobby Edwards.

You're the Reason may also refer to:

 You're the Reason (EP) or the title track, by Melinda Doolittle, 2013
 "You're the Reason", a song by Victoria Justice from Victorious: Music from the Hit TV Show
 "You're the Reason", a 1998 song by Wamdue Project (Chris Brann)

See also
 You Are the Reason (disambiguation)